Pietro Cesare Marani (born 1952) is an Italian art historian and curator. He is among the leading authorities on the life and works of Leonardo da Vinci having written of over 200 publications on the artist. These include book-length studies on the Portrait of a Musician and The Last Supper, an overview on Leonardo's time in Venice, and one of the two modern catalogue raisonné of Leonardo's works (the other being by Frank Zöllner). He is currently a professor at the Polytechnic University of Milan.

Life and career
Pietro Cesare Marani was born in 1952 in Italy. In his youth he studied with the art historian Anna Maria Brizio, a specialist on the works of Leonardo da Vinci. His earliest publications concerned the fortification designs of Leonardo. Currently, Marani is a Full Professor in Modern Art History at the Polytechnic University of Milan, as well as president of the  institute.

His past roles include leadership posts at the Soprintendenza per I Beni Artistici e Storici del Piemonte (director), the Pinacoteca di Brera (vice director), and The Last Supper'''s restoration project (co-director). He has curated many Leonardo exhibitions throughout Italy, particularly in 2019 during the 500th anniversary of the artist's death.

Marani's publications include more than 284 articles and books on the life and works of Leonardo da Vinci. Among them are Leonardo and Venice, Leonardo da Vinci's Last Supper (2009) on The Last Supper, and Leonardo da Vinci: Il musico on the Portrait of a Musician.  With Frank Zöllner's Leonardo da Vinci: The Complete Paintings and Drawings (2003), Marani's Leonardo da Vinci: The Complete Paintings'' (2000) is "the most thoroughly referenced catalogue raisonnés of Leonardo’s paintings". He has written numerous essays on other Italian Renaissance artists, including Francesco di Giorgio Martini, Ambrogio Bergognone, Bramantino and Bernardino Luini, and contemporary artists such as Peter Greenaway, Igor Mitoraj, Alessandro Papetti and Medhat Shafik. 

The art historian Kim H. Veltman described Marani in 2008 as "clearly the most significant scholar in the field [of Leonardo's art] at present", and by his colleague Martin Kemp in 2018 as "the greatest of his generation of Italian Leonardisti".

Selected bibliography

References

Citations

Sources
 
 
  

Living people
1952 births
Italian art historians
Italian curators
Leonardo da Vinci scholars